Jomoro is one of the constituencies represented in the Parliament of Ghana. It elects one Member of Parliament (MP) by the first past the post system of election. Jomoro is located in the Jomoro District  of the Western Region of Ghana.

Boundaries
The seat is located within the Jomoro District of the Western Region of Ghana with similar boundaries. To its west is the Côte d'Ivoire. The southern boundary is the Atlantic Ocean. The eastern neighbour is the Nzema East District and to the north are the Aowin/Suaman and the Wasa Amenfi West Districts.

Members of Parliament

Elections

See also
List of Ghana Parliament constituencies

References 

Adam Carr's Election Archives
Electoral Commission of Ghana
Ghana Home Page

Parliamentary constituencies in the Western Region (Ghana)